The Navasota River is a river in east Texas, United States.  It is about 125 miles (201 km) long, beginning near Mount Calm and flowing south into the Brazos River at a point where Brazos, Grimes, and Washington counties converge.

Name

The river has been known by several names. The indigenous people called it the Nabasoto, Domingo Terán de los Ríos called it San Cypriano, Fray Isidro Félix de Espinosa called it the San Buenaventura, and in 1727, Pedro de Rivera y Villalón named it the Navasota.

Lakes

The Navasota River is dammed to form several lakes, including Lake Mexia, Springfield Lake, Joe Echols Lake, Lake Groesbeck, Lake Limestone, and Lake Fort Parker in Fort Parker State Park.

See also
List of rivers of Texas
Navasota, Texas

Notes

References
Merriam-Webster's Geographical Dictionary, Third Edition. Springfield, Massachusetts: Merriam-Webster Incorporated, 1997.

Rivers of Texas
Brazos River
Rivers of Brazos County, Texas
Rivers of Grimes County, Texas
Rivers of Washington County, Texas
Rivers of Madison County, Texas
Rivers of Hill County, Texas
Rivers of Limestone County, Texas
Rivers of Leon County, Texas
Rivers of Robertson County, Texas